Otto Helgesen (4 July 1898  – 19 June 1973) was a Norwegian judge.

He was born in Fredrikstad to Helge Helgesen and Karen Elisabeth Nielsen. He graduated as cand.jur. in 1920, and was named as a Supreme Court Justice from 1950 to 1968. He was a member of the Labour Court of Norway from 1960, and chaired Prisrådet from 1962. He was decorated as a Commander of the Order of St. Olav. He died in 1973.

References

1898 births
1973 deaths
People from Fredrikstad
Supreme Court of Norway justices